The Perez Family is an American comedy film released in 1995 about a group of Cuban refugees in America who pretend to be a family.  It stars Marisa Tomei, Alfred Molina, Anjelica Huston, Chazz Palminteri, and other well-known actors.  It was based on the 1990 novel The Perez Family by Christine Bell.  The film was directed by Mira Nair.

The premise was that a group of unrelated people, who happened to share the last name "Pérez", realized they could more easily stay in America if they pretended to be family.  Set in 1980 during the Mariel boatlift, the movie shows Juan Raúl Pérez (Alfred Molina), a former aristocrat and newly released political prisoner, seeking to return to his wife, now in America, after 20 years.  Dottie Pérez (Marisa Tomei) is a former prostitute, who Juan meets.  U.S. Immigration officials assume the two are married, because of the common last name.  The potential for a real romantic relationship between the couple sets the basis for much of the rest of the film.

Cast
Selective cast listing:
Marisa Tomei - Dorita Evita Pérez
Alfred Molina - Juan Raúl Pérez
Anjelica Huston - Carmela Pérez
Chazz Palminteri - Lt. John Pirelli
Trini Alvarado - Teresa Pérez
Celia Cruz - Luz Pat
Ranjit Chowdhry - Indian immigration official
Diego Wallraff - Ángel Díaz
Ellen Cleghorne - Officer Rhoades
Angela Lanza - Flavia
Jose Felipe Padron - Felipe Pérez
Lázaro Pérez - Armando 'Papi' Pérez
Bill Sage - Steve Steverino
Vincent Gallo - Orlando
Billy Hopkins - Father Aiden
Ruben Rabasa - Father Martínez
Melissa Anne Acosta - Isabel
Archival footage of Jimmy Carter and Fidel Castro also appeared in the film.

Reception
The Perez Family received mixed reviews from critics, as it holds a 60% rating on Rotten Tomatoes based on 20 reviews.

Soundtrack
The soundtrack composed by Alan Silvestri was released by Music Box Records, paired with his score for Clean Slate.

External links 

CD soundtrack on Music Box Records

1995 films
1995 comedy films
American comedy films
Films about immigration to the United States
Films based on American novels
Films directed by Mira Nair
Films produced by Michael Nozik
Films scored by Alan Silvestri
Films set in 1980
Films set in Coral Gables, Florida
Films set in Miami
Films with screenplays by Robin Swicord
The Samuel Goldwyn Company films
1990s English-language films
1990s American films